Zignoichthys oblongus is an extinct prehistoric relative of the pufferfish and porcupine fish that lived during the Lutetian epoch of the Eocene.  Z. oblongus''' fossils are found from the Monte Bolca lagerstätte of what is now Italy.

It lacked a pelvis, and probably could not inflate its body like its modern-day relatives.  In life, it would have resembled a paunchy triggerfish or a pufferfish with an elongated, downturned face.

See also
 List of prehistoric bony fish
 Iraniplectus, a close relative from Oligocene Iran
 Eotetraodon, a genus of primitive pufferfish, one species, E. pygmaeus, lived sympatrically with Z. oblongus''

References

External links
  Mikko's Phylogeny Archive entry on "Tetraodontoidea"

Eocene fish
Tetraodontiformes
Fossils of Italy
Fossil taxa described in 1975